Bolma somaliensis is a species of sea snail, a marine gastropod mollusk in the family Turbinidae, the turban snails.

Description
The height of the pale fawn shell attains 28 mm, its diameter 24 mm. The small, solid shell with very short spines on the body whorl on peripheral angle. The height of moderately tall spire is usually greater than maximum width of shell. There is no trace of a sutural channel. The small basal callus is pale yellow, but turns to white near the columella. The aperture has a white color.

Distribution
This marine species occurs in the Indian Ocean off Somalia.

References

External links
 To Encyclopedia of Life
 To USNM Invertebrate Zoology Mollusca Collection
 To World Register of Marine Species

Endemic fauna of Somalia
somaliensis
Gastropods described in 1979